This is an incomplete list of notable inmates who were held at the Mauthausen-Gusen concentration camp.

Inmates
 Aart Alblas, Dutch navy officer, resistance member and Engelandvaarder (Mauthausen)
 György Bálint (originally surname Braun; 1919–2020), Hungarian horticulturist, Candidate of Agricultural Sciences, journalist, author, and politician who served as an MP.
 Otakar Batlička, journalist and member of the Czech resistance, radio amateur and illegal radio operator
Antonio García Barón, Spanish anarchist who fought with the Durruti Column (Mauthausen)
Francisco Boix, Spanish republican and photographer (he smuggled out 2,000 photos of the camp taken by the SS) 
 Marcelino Bilbao Bilbao, Spanish anarchist.
 Lucien Bunel - Père Jacques de Jesus, French Carmelite monk (Louis Malle dedicated to him his movie "Au revoir, les enfants") (Gusen)
 Jan Buzek, Polish politician from Czechoslovakia
 José Cabrero Arnal, Spanish-French cartoonist
 Marcel Callo, French activist of JOC beatified by Pope John Paul II (Gusen) 
 Aldo Carpi, Italian artist and university professor; author of memoirs covering his stay in Mauthausen and Gusen I (Gusen)
 Jean Cayrol, French writer and poet (Gusen)
 Józef Cebula, Catholic priest and martyr, beatified by Pope John Paul II
 Cornelis Compter, Dutch Olympic weightlifter
 René Cogny, French soldier
 Józef Cyrankiewicz, Polish Prime Minister (1947–1952 and 1956–1970)
 Józef Czempiel, Polish Catholic priest and martyr, beatified
 Antoni Czortek, Polish boxer
 Stanisław Dobosiewicz, Polish writer (Gusen)
 Svetolik Dragačevac, Serbian retiree arrested for typing a threatening letter personally addressed to Adolf Hitler
 Władysław Dworaczek, Polish educator
 Anthony Faramus, British actor
 Adolf Fierla, Polish poet and writer
 Leopold Figl, Austrian Chancellor (1945–1953) and Foreign Minister (1953–1959)
 Stefan Filipkiewicz, Polish painter
 Éva Földes, Hungarian author
 Roman Frister, Polish journalist
 János Garay, Hungarian fencer
 Oszkár Gerde, Hungarian fencer
 Johann Gruber, Austrian Catholic priest and resistance fighter (nicknamed: "Papa Gruber" or "The Saint of Gusen") (Gusen)
 Israel Gutman, Polish historian
 Győző Haberfeld, Hungarian gymnast
 Karel Hašler, Czech actor, songwriter and singer
 Oldřich Pechal, Czech soldier and resistance operative
 Roger Heim, French member of Académie française (Gusen)
 Pierre Jeanpierre, French soldier and resistance member
 Jan Jesenský Jr., Czechoslovakian scientist
 János Kádár, later Prime Minister of Hungary, escaped being transferred to Mauthausen
 Iakovos Kambanelis, Greek writer
 Dmitry Karbyshev, Russian general
 Jerzy Kaźmirkiewicz, Polish scientist
 Wilhelm Kling, German communist
 Artur London, Czechoslovakian communist
 Hugo Lunardon (de), Austrian policeman who investigated activities of the DNSAP prior to the Anschluss
 Witold Dzierżykraj-Morawski, a Colonel of the Polish Army, posthumously promoted to the rank of General
 Captain Isidore Newman, special Operations Executive, see https://nigelperrin.com/isidorenewman.htm
 Gilbert Norman, SOE agent
 Antonín Novotný, President of Czechoslovakia (1957–1968)
 Gottfried Ochshorn, member of the French Resistance
 Bernard Offen
 Jan Stanisław Olbrycht, Polish lawyer and university professor
 David Olère, Polish artist
 Jean Origer, Luxembourgian cleric and director of the Luxemburger Wort
 Wiktor Ormicki, Polish geographer and university professor (Gusen)
 Giuseppe Pagano, Italian architect
 Vincenzo Pappalettera, Italian young antifascist in 1967 published  ("You are going to pass through the chimney"), an account of Mauthausen's tortures
 František Pecháček, Czech gymnast
 Peter van Pels, known as Peter van Daan in the diary of Anne Frank, one of seven other Jews to hide with her in Amsterdam.
 Otto Peltzer, German middle distance runner
 Karol Piegza, Polish writer, teacher and folklorist
 Avgust Pirjevec, Slovenian literary historian (Gusen)
 Ivan Potrč, Slovenian writer and playwright
 Kazimierz Prószyński, Polish inventor and pioneer of film making
 Gustaw Przeczek, Polish writer and teacher
 Heinrich Rau, East German politician
 Lionel Romney, an African American sailor in the US Merchant Marine
 Tibor Rubin, Hungarian-born American soldier
 Bernat Rosner, Hungarian lawyer
 William Salcer, Czech inventor
 Henryk Sławik, a Polish diplomat who saved over 5,000 Jews during the war (Gusen)
 Karol Śliwka, a Polish politician from Czechoslovakia
 Ota Šik (Otto Schick), Czechoslovakian communist economist and politician
 Mike Staner, Polish author
 Stanisław Staszewski, Polish architect and poet
 Brian Stonehouse, British painter and SOE member
 Itzchak Tarkay, Austrian-born Israeli painter
 Grzegorz Timofiejew, Polish poet
 Štěpán Trochta, Czech priest
 Nikolai Vlasov, Soviet pilot, prisoner of war, and underground resistance organizer
 Prežihov Voranc, Slovenian writer and Communist activist
 Simon Wiesenthal, hunter of Nazi war criminals and author of several books, including two on the camp
 Artur Woźniak, Polish footballer

References

German military-related lists
Lists of Nazi concentration camps
Lists of prisoners and detainees
Inmates
Germany in World War II-related lists